It's a Grand Life is a 1953 British comedy film starring Frank Randle and Diana Dors. Music hall comedian Frank Randle who had previously starred in a film series of World War II army comedies (Somewhere in England (1940), Somewhere in Camp (1942), Somewhere on Leave (1942), Somewhere in Civvies (1943), Somewhere in Politics (1949)) stars as an accident-prone Private in his final film appearance.  The film also features the professional wrestler Jack Pye and the popular pianist Winifred Atwell.  The role of Pte Pendergast was played by Arthur White, who is the elder brother of the actor Sir David Jason.

Plot
The film is described in its opening titles as a comedy burlesque and is not meant to be derogatory to the army.  Rather than having a tight plot, the film is a series of sketches set against army life in the Essex Regiment in the post World War II era mostly involving an old private (Frank Randle). One of the sub plots involves a glamorous Women's Royal Army Corps Corporal being pursued and sexually harassed by her Company Sergeant Major (Michael Brennan).  Other set pieces include a wrestling match with Jack Pye and a drill sequence.

Cast
 Frank Randle – Pte. Randle
 Diana Dors – Cpl. Paula Clements
 Dan Young – Pte. Young
 Michael Brennan – Sgt. Maj. O'Reilly
 Jennifer Jayne – Pte. Desmond
 John Blythe – Pte. Philip Green
 Anthony Hulme – Capt. Saunders
 Charles Peters – Pte. Rubenstein
 Arthur White – Pte. Prendergast
 Leslie Gould
 Kevin Peters
 Ian Fleming – Mr. Clements
 Ruth Taylor – Mrs. Clements
 Jack Pye – Himself, Wrestler
 Bill Gernon – Himself, Wrestler
 Cab Cashford – Himself, Wrestler
 Carl Van Wurden – Himself, Wrestler
 Winifred Atwell – Herself, Guest Artiste
 Peter Mullings – Dance Hall Manager (uncredited)
 George Jackson – Jeep Driver (Uncredited)

Production
It was one of several low-budget comedies Dors made around this time. She was paid £1,000 for five weeks work, the fee she had been paid for on Is Your Honeymoon Really Necessary?. She said "I loathed the script and everything about it" but her then manager, husband Dennis Hamilton, insisted. The film was shot in Manchester. Dors said she got along with Randle, but that his drinking and temperament held up production.

Critical reception
In the Radio Times, Tony Sloman called it a "quaint and cheap army caper," and wrote of Randle, "If you've never seen him, give this a chance you might find he'll tickle your fancy. But if you have an aversion to music-hall stars on celluloid, give up, for Randle has neither the wit of George Formby nor the warmth of Gracie Fields, and by the time this movie was made he was looking tired and rather grubby."

References

External links

1953 films
British black-and-white films
1953 comedy films
British comedy films
Military humor in film
Films shot in Greater Manchester
1950s English-language films
1950s British films